Takuya Masuda (増田 卓也, born 29 June 1989) is a Japanese professional football goalkeeper who plays for Roasso Kumamoto.

Club statistics
Updated to end of 2018 season.

1Includes Japanese Super Cup, FIFA Club World Cup and J. League Championship.

References

External links

Profile at V-Varen Nagasaki

1989 births
Living people
Ryutsu Keizai University alumni
Association football people from Hiroshima Prefecture
Japanese footballers
J1 League players
J2 League players
Sanfrecce Hiroshima players
V-Varen Nagasaki players
FC Machida Zelvia players
Roasso Kumamoto players
Asian Games medalists in football
Footballers at the 2010 Asian Games
Association football goalkeepers
Asian Games gold medalists for Japan
Medalists at the 2010 Asian Games
Universiade gold medalists for Japan
Universiade medalists in football
Medalists at the 2011 Summer Universiade